Claybrook House is a historic home located near Kearney, Clay County, Missouri. It was built about 1858, and is a two-story, "L"-shaped, Federal style frame dwelling.  It features a Greek Revival style entrance surrounded by 14 window lights.

It was listed on the National Register of Historic Places in 1981.

References

Houses on the National Register of Historic Places in Missouri
Federal architecture in Missouri
Houses completed in 1858
Buildings and structures in Clay County, Missouri
National Register of Historic Places in Clay County, Missouri